Imhotep is a horizontally scrolling shooter for the Commodore 64 published in the United Kingdom by Ultimate Play the Game on 15 October 1985. The game is set in Ancient Egypt and revolves around Imhotep the Wise and his mission to stop the famine plaguing the kingdom by obtaining sacred books. Imhotep was developed by Spaniard Manuel Caballero over a period of ten months during his gap year.

Gameplay

Imhotep is a scrolling shooter similar to Defender. In the game the title character flies on a mystic bird which uses power bolts to shoot down enemies. The player must also avoid the stones flung by catapults.

Reception
The game received overwhelmingly negative reviews upon release, with many critics citing it as the worst game published by Ultimate. John Reed from Zzap!64 was convinced that it would damage Ultimate's reputation as one of Britain's leading software development houses.

It was well received by Your Commodore'''s  reviewer, who said that it was "an infuriatingly addictive game."

References

External links
 Imhotep at Gamebase 64
 
 Imhotep review in Zzap!64''

1985 video games
Commodore 64 games
Commodore 64-only games
Rare (company) games
Horizontally scrolling shooters
Video games set in Egypt
Video games developed in the United Kingdom